Hawthorn is an inner suburb of Melbourne, Victoria, Australia,  east of Melbourne's central business district, located within the City of Boroondara local government area. Hawthorn recorded a population of 22,322 at the 2021 census.

Glenferrie Road, Hawthorn, is designated as one of 82 Major Activity Centres in the Melbourne 2030 Metropolitan Strategy.

History 
The name Hawthorn, gazetted in 1840 as "Hawthorne", is thought to have originated from a conversation involving Charles La Trobe, who commented that the native shrubs looked like flowering Hawthorn bushes. Alternatively the name may originate with the bluestone house, so named, and built by James Denham St Pinnock), which stands to this day.

Population
In the 2016 Census, there were 23,511 people in Hawthorn. 60.5% of people were born in Australia. The next most common countries of birth were India 4.6%, China 4.0%, England 3.0%, Malaysia 1.9% and New Zealand 1.8%. 68.5% of people spoke only English at home. Other languages spoken at home included Mandarin 5.1%, Vietnamese 1.7%, Hindi 1.4%, Cantonese 1.4% and Arabic 1.3%. The most common responses for religion were No Religion 38.9% and Catholic 18.8%.

Educational institutions 

Hawthorn is the home of Swinburne University of Technology, which offers university and TAFE courses.

The suburb is also the home of a number of private schools, such as Erasmus Primary School, Saint Joseph's Primary School, Rossbourne School and Scotch College.

The area gives good geographical access to private schools in Camberwell, Malvern and Hawthorn East, including Alia College, De La Salle College and Bialik College, as well as those in Kew and Canterbury, such as Xavier College, Carey Baptist Grammar School, Methodist Ladies' College, Ruyton Girls' School, Genazzano FCJ College, Camberwell Grammar School, Camberwell Girls Grammar School and Trinity Grammar School.

The suburb also contains good state-run schools, such as Glenferrie Primary School, Hawthorn West Primary School and Auburn High School. The area also gives access to state schools in nearby Hawthorn East; Hawthorn Secondary College, Auburn Primary School and Auburn South Primary School. Just west of Hawthorn (in Richmond) is the Melbourne Girls' College.

Economy 

Glenferrie Road is a major shopping strip, with two supermarkets, all major banks and many chain and specialty stores. There are also shopping centres at the corner of Burwood Road and Power Street, in Church Street, in Auburn Road (the western side of which is within the Hawthorn postcode, while the eastern side is in Hawthorn East), the corner of Glenferrie Road and Riversdale Road and the corner of Auburn Road and Riversdale Road.

Hawthorn is particularly noted for the number, range and quality of its restaurants, many of which reflect the strong ethnic diversity of the region. There are also many nightclubs and hotels in the suburb.

Although mainly noted as a residential region, there is some industry in the area, particularly in Burwood Road, between Power Street and Auburn Road.

In the 12-month period to January 2020 Hawthorn reported a median house price of A$1.76 million for a three bedroom house.

Amcor and Orora are among the companies based in Hawthorn.

Public facilities 

The City of Boroondara retains offices in the former Hawthorn Town Hall, in Burwood Road (near the corner of Glenferrie Road). This building is noted as a good example of late 19th Century public-building architecture. Boroondara City Council, Swinburne University and many other organisations maintain many important facilities within the city. These include sports grounds and other sporting facilities, public barbecues, infant welfare centres, youth clubs (including the Hawthorn Citizens' Youth Club, scouts and guides), churches of most denominations, etc. Hawthorn citizens also have access to nearby synagogues in Kew, East Kew and Doncaster and a mosque in Doncaster. The Baháʼí Faith also has a presence in the suburb.

Swinburne University hosts a makeshift musalla for Muslims, which is used on Fridays for Juma prayers, for both students and common people.

The suburb also has a number of public recreation areas and the suburb is noted for the number, size and quality of its parks, many of which still retain layouts that were first made in the 19th century. Hawthorn was originally a brick-making area and many of its parks are on the sites of former quarries, which were filled-in by them becoming tips and then parkland.

Transport 
Hawthorn is serviced by two railway stations; Hawthorn and Glenferrie. It is also served by tram routes 16, 48, 70, 72, 75 and 109.

Sport 
The suburb is the spiritual home of the Hawthorn Football Club of the AFL. It is also home to the Hawthorn Citizens, a junior Australian rules football team who compete in the Yarra Junior Football League.

Old Scotch Soccer Club are located at HA Smith Reserve and compete in the Victorian State League Division 2.

There is a Cricket Club, the Hawthorn Cricket Club and as well as a Hockey Club, the Hawthorn Hockey Club in the suburb.

The suburb also contains two tennis clubs, the Grace Park Tennis Club and the Hawthorn Tennis Club.

Architecture 
Hawthorn expanded rapidly during the 1880s land boom when grand Victorian houses built in subdivisions like the Grace Park Estate spoke of an upper class suburb. High rates of home ownership, a plethora of noteworthy independent schools (including, from 1916, Scotch College), grand churches, and prominent sporting clubs such as the Grace Park Tennis Club, consolidated Hawthorn's status as an affluent area. Yet the outstanding opulence of residences like John Beswicke's Rotha in Harcourt Street was still the preserve of a minority. By the 1880s working-class families lived in single-fronted, wood-blocked cottages on low-lying subdivisions like those forming Melville, Smart, Barton and Connell streets. Many worked in Hawthorn's clay brickworks found principally in Auburn, east of the village and around the lower parts of Gardiners Creek. Hawthorn bricks referred to as 'pinks', 'blacks' and 'browns' adorned the polychromatic façades of many local houses. During the depression, residential sections of Hawthorn were equally as run-down as those in determinedly working-class Richmond across the Yarra River.

Grace Park Estate 
Grace Park Estate, Hawthorn is located on a gently-sloping site in the eastern suburbs of Melbourne and contains a residential subdivision to the north and public gardens and sporting facilities to the south. The residential portion of the estate contains three curved crescents, intersecting streets and Mary Street as the northern boundary. Streets are tree-lined and contain a fine collection of Victorian and Edwardian houses. A curved portion of open land runs through the estate, once the site of the Kew railway line.
Grace Park Estate, Hawthorn, consists of the roadways and public open space within the boundaries of Glenferrie Road, the Melbourne-Lilydale railway reserve, Power Street and the laneway between Mary Street and Kinkora Road; excluding land associated with the Glenferrie Oval Grandstand which is already listed in the Victorian Heritage Register as H0890. This site is part of the traditional land of the Kulin nation.

The 1884 Grace Park subdivision, which forms the boundaries of this nomination, was not completely realised. Instead areas to the south were unsold and acquired by the Hawthorn City Council and developed for public purposes in the twentieth century. The residential section to the north of the precinct retains the main pattern of gently curving crescents and perpendicular roads. Bluestone laneways remain largely intact and street trees have generally been replanted from the 1920s onwards. The bisecting of the residential estate by the Kew railway line had a large impact on development, necessitating the insertion of a cutting and the construction of bridges to enable the continuation of the crescents. The subsequent removal of this has left a wide reserve and altered the crescent pattern with the continuation of Hilda Crescent along the former railway reserve.

Invergowrie – originally Burwood or Burwood Hill (1850) 
Built by James Palmer (later Sir) in 1850 and the original source of the name of the current Burwood Road. Mayor of Melbourne in 1846, he established the first punt to cross the eastern Yarra around the current Bridge Road area in 1842. The cost was said to be around the equivalent of 45 cents (expensive for the time) but it was very successful and assisted the development and sale of the original Hawthorn allotments. The house was sold after Palmers death in 1871 and subdivided by entrepreneur George Coppin to create the landmark Saint James Estate.

The Hawthorns – originally The Falls (1845) 
Probably Hawthorn's oldest and most famous house, built of bluestone in 1845 for James Denham Pinnock (1810–1875), Deputy Registrar of the Supreme Court, before there was a bridge across the river. His property stretched from Church Street to the river, between Denham Street and Lawes Street and was subdivided circa 1850. The homestead block, west of Calvin Street was acquired by pioneer squatter Henry Creswick, whose family remained there for 70 years. Its view was altered by the subsequent development along Creswick Street and Osbourne Court. In the 1856 electoral roll, Creswick's address was given as Hawthorne House. Both Pinnock and Creswick were leading members of the Anglican Church.

Governor Hotham Hotel, Burwood Road (1855) 
One of Hawthorn's first hotels, it was constructed in 1855 and has been continuously operating for 157 years. Operated and owned by John Conran, the hotel was the site for many significant meetings that were instrumental in the development of Hawthorn. Important organisations such as the Boroondara District Road Board used it as a meeting place as they were responsible for the development of roads in an area of 5180 hectares (20 square miles). Now known as "The Hawthorn".

Grace Park House, Chrystobel Crescent (1858) 
One of the most significant properties in Hawthorn, the house was constructed by Michael Lynch in 1858 on a massive parcel of 38 hectares (95 acres) bounded by Power Street to the west, Barkers Road to the north, Glenferrie Road to the east and down to Burwood Road in the south (where the original entrance drive was located). The house originally comprised 8 rooms but had grown to 18 by 1870 and after Lynch's death was occupied by Mrs Robert Colvin Clark's Ladies College in 1874. The Estate was subdivided in 1884 into the magnificent Grace Park Estate and lots were sold into the early twentieth century giving rise to its superb Victorian and Edwardian character. The old Kew railway line originally cut through the Estate in 1887 and the Barker railway station was on the northern boundary. The old train route is still easily discernible by the tract of parkland that gently curves through the streets.

Hawthorn Arts Centre 
The Hawthorn Town Hall building was designed by John Beswicke, and opened with a grand ball in October 1889. In 1911, architect John Koch designed extensions and renovations, with a balcony in the hall, new decorations and a clock in the tower. In 1930 Stuart Calder designed additions–a new Council chamber, new upper foyer and entrance portico. Weekly dances (Saturday nights), debutante balls, concerts, wedding receptions, soup kitchens, immunisation programmes and more recently craft markets are just some of the activities which have taken place in the beautiful ballroom of Hawthorn Town Hall. Over 2012–2013 the Hawthorn Town Hall underwent a $17.9 million refurbishment as a key Boroondara Arts and Cultural facility, with new amenities, including meeting rooms, new art galleries, a gallery commercial area, exhibition and workshop spaces and a café. It was reopened in late 2013 as the Hawthorn Arts Centre.

Kawarau 
The house was built as Warrington for Robert Robinson in 1891 and 1892. It had 12 rooms and 22 acres of land in 1893. Frederick John Cato (of Moran & Cato fame) bought the house and moved in with his family in 1895. The name Kawarau comes from the name of a New Zealand river. Much later it became "Stephanie’s Restaurant" for some years. It is now occupied by Alia College. Frederick Cato's daughter wrote a book about the family. She contacted the historical society about names of Hawthorn streets. With the possibility of a brickworks on the north part of the original Tooronga estate, her father bought the property. It was partly subdivided as Tooronga Heights before World War I, with street names for family, friends and New Zealand place names, beginning with "B" for streets lying east and west and "L" for those lying north and south. In 1934, the present Cato Park was donated to Hawthorn.

Tay Creggan 
Tay Creggan, 30 Yarra Street on the banks of the Yarra River, was built in 1892 and was perhaps intended by architect Guyon Purchas to be his own home. However, it was tenanted during the 1890s depression, then the McKean family before World War I and then by the Mortell family. Later, it was owned by the Roman Catholic Church and occupied by the "Ladies of the Grail" from 1939 until 1969. Now owned by Strathcona Baptist Girls Grammar School, it is used as a Year 9 campus. The roof and detailed chimneys were restored in 1993 and boatsheds built near the river. It is frequently rented out by the school to use the original hall for functions.

Christ Church 
Christ Church Hawthorn, designed by Charles Vickers, is heritage listed by the National Trust of Australia. It is one of the earliest surviving suburban churches. The foundation stone of the church was laid on 19 November 1853, by Governor Charles La Trobe, who also donated the font in 1854. The organ and bell were presented to the church by prominent Melbourne businessman Sir James Palmer, MLA, who lived nearby. The church is noted for its elaborate wooden chancel screen and many fine historic stained glass windows including those by local craftsmen Ferguson, Urie and Lyon. The bluestone Gothic-style Anglican church is situated picturesquely on the hill at the corner of Denham and Church Streets.

Notable people 
Notable people from or who have lived in Hawthorn include:
 Kenneth Grant Jamieson (1925–1976), a neuroscientist with particular interest in head injuries, was influential in bringing about state legislation in limiting drivers' blood alcohol and requiring motorcyclists to wear helmets.
 Joseph Fowler (1888–1972), established his eponymous company 'Fowlers Vacola Manufacturing Co. Ltd' at the corner of Power Street and Burwood Road in Hawthorn in 1920.
 Daniel Francis Murphy, grew up in Hawthorn prior to opening the chain liquor store Dan Murphy's in 1952.
 Harry Wyatt Wunderly (1892–1971), instrumental in the management and reduction of tuberculosis in Australia.
 Tom Gleisner – television host.
 Tom Allsop – VFL Footballer, grew up in and played for Hawthorn Football Club
 Noah Anderson – AFL Footballer, grew up in Hawthorn
 Simon Holmes à Court – Entrepreneur and founder of Climate 200
 John Gardiner (1798–1878) – Pastoralist
 James Frederick Palmer (1803–1871) – first President of the Victorian Legislative Council and Mayor of Melbourne. 
 George Swinburne (1861–1928) – engineer, politician and philanthropist, founder of Swinburne University of Technology
 Percy Grainger (1882–1961) – composer
 Fred Williams (1927–1982) – artist
 Michael O'Grady (politician) (1824–1876) – Former Member of the Victorian Legislative Assembly
 Hugh Trumble (1867 – 1938) - cricketer

Gallery

See also 
 City of Hawthorn – Hawthorn was previously within this former local government area.

References 
  (via Internet Archive)

Suburbs of Melbourne
Suburbs of the City of Boroondara